St. Matthew is a Roman Catholic church in Norwalk, Connecticut, part of the  Diocese of Bridgeport.

History
Saint Matthew Parish was founded November 14, 1957. Rev. James F. McGrath was appointed the first Pastor. On September 18, 1960, Rev. Bishop Lawrence J. Sheehan officiated at the Blessing of the Cornerstone and Dedication of the completed Spiritual Center for Saint Matthew. This building served various parish needs.

References

External links 
 St. Matthew - website
 Diocese of Bridgeport

Modernist architecture in Connecticut
20th-century Roman Catholic church buildings in the United States
Roman Catholic churches in Norwalk, Connecticut
1957 establishments in Connecticut